Examu, formerly known as Yuki Enterprise, was a Japanese video game company founded in 2000. It mostly produced fighting games for arcades and home consoles. It is known for owning Team Arcana, the developer of the original intellectual property series Arcana Heart. Initially, they developed games for their own arcade system board called eX-Board, to release their games mostly on Taito's NESiCAxLive arcade delivery system. Support for eX-Board ceased in December, 2013. At the end of February 2020, Examu suspended their business operations. Any ongoing development works and product supports (most particularly ongoing supported fighting games (including licensed fighting games)) has since migrated to its rebranded successor since 2019, Team Arcana.

Games

Arcade games

Console games

Notes
PlayStation 3 version is digital-only.
eShop release only.
PlayStation 4 version only.

References

External links
 

Video game companies established in 2007
Japanese companies established in 2007
Amusement companies of Japan
Software companies based in Tokyo
Video game companies of Japan
Video game development companies
Video game publishers